Eliea is a genus of flowering plants, shrubs or small trees, in the St. Johnswort family, Hypericaceae. It comprises a single species, Eliea articulata, which is endemic to Madagascar.

The genus was named in honor of M. Elie de Beaumont. Eliea articulata was originally described as Hypericum articulatum Lam. in 1797. It was renamed Eliea articulata in 1830, published in the Annales des Sciences Naturelles.

The flowers have five petals, numerous stamens, and three styles.

Eliea brevistyla and Eliea majorifolia are considered synonyms in Kew's Plants of the World Online and the Tropicos Catalogue of the Plants of Madagascar.

References

 
Monotypic Malpighiales genera